Stanisław Wielgus (born 1939) is a former Roman Catholic archbishop of Warsaw.

Wielgus may also refer to:

 Wielgus, Poland, a village in Kazimierza County, Świętokrzyskie Voivodeship
 Joanna Scheuring-Wielgus (born 1972), Polish politician
 Marek Wielgus (1950–1996), Polish politician

See also